Chickamin Glacier may refer to:

Chickamin Glacier (Alaska)
Chickamin Glacier (Washington), in the North Cascades, Washington, USA